Bungebreen is a glacier in Sørkapp Land at Spitsbergen, Svalbard. It has a length of about ten kilometers, and is located east of the mountain Wiederfjellet. The glacier is named after Russian Arctic explorer Alexandr Alexandrovich Bunge.

See also
Bungeelva
Bungevatnet

References

Glaciers of Spitsbergen